Kansas City Revisited is an album by jazz trombonist and arranger Bob Brookmeyer featuring Brookmeyer's new orchestrations of 1920s and '30s era Kansas City jazz tunes. The album was recorded in 1958 for the United Artists label.

Reception 

The Allmusic review by Scott Yanow called it a "memorable set" and stated "Cool jazz meets swing on this valuable but long out-of-print LP".

Track listing 
 "Jumpin' at the Woodside" (Count Basie) – 7:37 	
 "A Blues" (Big Miller) – 5:05	
 "Blue and Sentimental" (Basie, Jerry Livingston, Mack David) – 6:53 	
 "Doggin' Around" (Edgar Battle, Herschel Evans) – 8:39 	
 "Moten Swing" (Bennie Moten, Buster Moten) – 10:12 	
 "Travlin' Light" (Trummy Young, Jimmy Mundy, Johnny Mercer) – 3:32

Personnel 
 Bob Brookmeyer – valve trombone
 Al Cohn, Paul Quinichette – tenor saxophone
 Nat Pierce – piano
 Jim Hall – guitar
 Addison Farmer – bass
 Osie Johnson – drums
 Big Miller – vocals (tracks 2 & 6)

References 

1959 albums
United Artists Records albums
Bob Brookmeyer albums